Gare de Paimpol is a railway station serving the town Paimpol, Côtes-d'Armor department, western France. It's the terminus of the line from Guingamp. The station is served by regional trains to Guingamp.

See also
 Réseau Breton

References

TER Bretagne
Railway stations in France opened in 1894
Railway stations in Côtes-d'Armor